The following are the football (soccer) events of the year 1965 throughout the world.

Events
Copa Libertadores 1965: Won by Independiente after defeating Peñarol on an aggregate score of 4–1.
 February 6:Retirement of Sir Stanley Matthews from professional football, five days after his fiftieth birthday.
 Substitutions allowed: The Football League voted 39 to 10 in favour of allowing clubs to introduce a substitute for an injured player at any time during a league match.
 FC Twente (Enschede, the Netherlands) was founded
 FC Hansa Rostock was founded
 1. FC Magdeburg was founded
1965 International Soccer League
League: Polonia Bytom defeated New York Americans, 5–1 on aggregate.
Cup: Polonia Bytom defeated FK Dukla Prague 3–1, on aggregate.

Winners club national championship

Asia
 : Toyo Industries
 : Al-Maref

Europe
 : Manchester United
 : Nantes
 : KR
 : Internazionale Milano F.C.
 : Feyenoord Rotterdam
 : Kilmarnock
 : Real Madrid
 : Fenerbahçe
 : Werder Bremen

North America
 : Chivas Guadalajara

South America
 : Boca Juniors
 : Santos
 : Universidad de Chile
: Olimpia Asunción

International tournaments
 African Cup of Nations in Tunisia (November 12 – 21 1965)
 
 
 
1965 British Home Championship (October 3, 1964 – April 10, 1965)

Births

January 1 – Khabib Ilyaletdinov, Russian club player
January 9 – Iain Dowie, English-Northern Irish footballer, manager and pundit
January 13 – Bennett Masinga, South African international footballer (died 2013)
February 4 – John van Loen, Dutch footballer and assistant-coach
February 5 – Gheorghe Hagi, Romanian footballer, manager and club owner
February 15 – Gustavo Quinteros, Bolivian footballer and manager
March 3 – Dragan Stojković, Serbian international and coach
March 8 – Juan Hernández Ramírez, Mexican international footballer
May 4 – Aykut Kocaman, Turkish international
May 17 – Massimo Crippa, Italian international footballer
May 23 – Manuel Sanchís Hontiyuelo, Spanish international footballer
June 7 – Jean-Pierre François, French footballer and singer
June 12 – Carlos Luis Morales, Ecuadorian goalkeeper
June 30 – Dietmar Drabek, Austrian referee
July 17 – Muhamad Radhi Mat Din, Malaysian coach and footballer
July 18 – Rosanan Samak, Bruneian football coach
July 27 – José Luis Chilavert, Paraguayan goalkeeper
July 27 – Trifon Ivanov, Bulgarian international footballer (died 2016)
July 30 – Leonel Álvarez, Colombian footballer
August 9 – David Kealy, Irish footballer
August 21 – Juan Lombardi, former Uruguayan footballer
August 30 – Peter Grant, Scottish football player and manager
August 31 – Ricardo Gónzalez, Chilean footballer
September 7 – Darko Pančev, Macedonian footballer
September 24 – Roberto Siboldi, Uruguayan footballer
October 6 – Jürgen Kohler, German international footballer and manager
November 16 – Mika Aaltonen, Finnish international footballer
November 17 – Terence Mophuting, Botswanan footballer
November 24 – Tom Boyd, Scottish footballer
November 25 – Mauro Blanco, Bolivian footballer
December 10 – José Aurelio Gay, Spanish football player and manager

Deaths

January
 January 21 - Arie Bieshaar (65), Dutch footballer (born 1899)

August
 August 24 – Amílcar Barbuy, Brazilian midfielder, known as one of the most influential players of Sport Club Corinthians Paulista. (72)
 August 30 – Píndaro de Carvalho Rodrigues, Brazilian midfielder and manager of the Brazil National Football Team at the 1930 FIFA World Cup, winner of the 1919 South American Championship. (73)

October
 October 11 – Roberto Cherro, Argentine forward, scored 213 goals for Boca Juniors, runner up of the 1930 FIFA World Cup . (58)

References

 
Association football by year